Warrick Venter (born 12 February 1993), is a South African rugby union player, who most recently played with the . His regular position is hooker.

Rugby career

2012–14: Sharks academy and College Rovers

Venter attended Selborne College in East London, South Africa. He was included in the  squad for the 2012 Under-19 Provincial Championship and was named in their matchday squad for all thirteen of their matches in the competition, although he only started in two of those matches. His side finished in third position on the log to qualify for the semi-finals and he was an unused replacement as  ran out 46–35 winners.

At the start of 2014, Venter represented College Rovers in the 2014 SARU Community Cup competition. He made two starts and two appearances as a replacement in their matches in Pool B during the group stages, helping them to four consecutive victories and scoring tries in their matches against Welkom and Bloemfontein Crusaders. He started all three of their matches during the finals tournament held in George over the Easter weekend. College Rovers won their quarter final match against Old Selbornians 36–13, before losing to Rustenburg Impala in the semi-finals. That meant they played in the Plate Final (effectively the third-place play-off), where Venter scored his third try of the competition against Hamiltons, but it wasn't enough, as the team from Cape Town won 27–18 to condemn College Rovers to fourth spot in the competition.

2014–: Eastern Province Under-21 and NMMU Madibaz

He made one start and two appearances as a replacement in s' three matches during the regular season, which saw them record seven consecutive victories to finish top of the log. He missed out on the semi-final, but did play off the bench in the final, as his side beat  46–3 to secure the Group B title. He started in their next match – a promotion play-off match against  for the right to play in Group A in 2015 – as they won the match 64–9 to secure their promotion to the top tier.

He made five appearances as NMMU finished the second in seventh (and second-last) position on the log. He returned for NMMU's 2016 season and started four of their matches; his side emulated their 2015 form and once again finished in seventh position.

References

1993 births
Living people
Eastern Province Elephants players
Rugby union hookers
Rugby union players from East London, Eastern Cape
South African rugby union players